Amy Hauck Newman is an American medicinal chemist who is the scientific director of the intramural research program at the National Institute on Drug Abuse. She researches the design, synthesis, and evaluation of central nervous system (CNS) active agents as potential treatment medications for substance use disorders, with an emphasis on selective ligands for the dopaminergic system.

Life 
Newman completed a B.S. in chemistry at the Mary Washington College. Newman received her Ph.D. in medicinal chemistry from the Medical College of Virginia under the mentorship of Richard A. Glennon. For her postdoctoral studies, she joined the laboratory of Kenner C. Rice at the National Institutes of Health (NIH). She conducted total opiate synthesis through a National Research Service Award funded by the National Institute on Drug Abuse (NIDA).

Newman is the Chief of NIDA’s Molecular Targets and Medications Discovery Branch, and Director of the NIDA Intramural Research Program (IRP) Medication Development Program. She researches the design, synthesis, and evaluation of central nervous system (CNS) active agents as potential treatment medications for substance use disorders, with an emphasis on selective ligands for the dopaminergic system. In 2014, she received the Marian W. Fischman Lectureship Award from the College on Problems of Drug Dependence. In 2016, she was the first woman to receive the Philip Portoghese Lectureship Award, awarded by the Division of Medicinal Chemistry and the Journal of Medicinal Chemistry. In 2018, she was honored as a “Remarkable Woman in Medicinal Chemistry” at the 255th American Chemical Society National Meeting. In 2019, Newman received the NIH Ruth L. Kirschstein Mentoring Award from the NIH Office of the Director. On November 22, 2020, Newman became the NIDA IRP scientific director. She had been acting in the role for the previous two years.

References 

Living people
Year of birth missing (living people)
Place of birth missing (living people)
University of Mary Washington alumni
Medical College of Virginia alumni
National Institutes of Health people
American medical researchers
Women medical researchers
Organic chemists
American women chemists
21st-century American chemists
21st-century American women scientists